Jerzy Osiatyński (2 November 1941 – 4 February 2022) was a Polish politician. A member of the Democratic Union, he served in the Sejm from 1989 to 2001 and was Minister of Finance from 1992 to 1993. 

Osiatyński died in Warsaw on 4 February 2022, at the age of 80.

References

1941 births
2022 deaths
Politicians from Riga
Democratic Union (Poland) politicians
Members of the Contract Sejm
Members of the Polish Sejm 1991–1993
Members of the Polish Sejm 1993–1997
Members of the Polish Sejm 1997–2001
Finance Ministers of Poland